Kateřina Skronská (born 22 January 1958) is a former professional tennis player from Czechoslovakia. After her marriage with Czech basketball player Zdeněk Böhm she became known as Kateřina Böhmová-Skronská.

She is the mother of former pro tennis player Kateřina Klapková-Böhmová.

External links
 
 
 

1958 births
Czech female tennis players
Czechoslovak female tennis players
Living people
Tennis players from Prague
Place of birth missing (living people)